Salix petrophila, commonly known as alpine willow and Rocky Mountain willow, is a Northwest American mountain shrub in the willow family (Salicaceae).

Habitat and range

Growth pattern

Leaves and stems
The other mat forming Sierra Nevada alpine willow, Salix nivalis, has smaller leaves ( that are hairless when young.

Inflorescence and fruit

Ecological interactions
It is pollinated by ants, as are some other willows.

References

petrophila